Akana is a small town in Ogooué-Ivindo Province, north central Gabon.

Notes

External links
 Akana Map — Satellite Images of Akana" Maplandia World Gazetteer

Populated places in Ogooué-Ivindo Province